Only for You is a 2008 romance film directed by Donna Persico set in early 1990s. The film stars Shea Curry and Michael Buie. The film is produced by Michael D. Jones and Donna Persico. The production company of the film is Silver Heart Productions.

Plot
Set in the early 1990s, Dana (Shea Curry), a recently divorced young woman embarking on an acting career. Months earlier she met a young, charismatic, theater castmate, Jack (Michael Buie), in the spring play at the local dinner theater. They seemingly look like good friends until flashbacks expose their history and brush with romance. Thus, "can a man and woman really be 'just friends. Only For You is a story about life, love, friendships, choices and believing in ourselves at all costs. It addresses the question: "What happens when you find the right love at the wrong time?" and it is a story about life, love, friendships, choices and believing in ourselves at all costs.

Casts

External links
 

2008 films
2000s romance films